Stade Aline Municipal de Richard Toll is a multi-use stadium in Richard Toll, Senegal.  It is currently used mostly for football matches and serves as a home ground of AS Sucrière de La Réunion de Richard-Toll (before the company name change, once known as CSS Richard-Toll). The stadium holds 10,000 people.

The 2000 CAF Cup and the 2006 CAF Confederation Cup had half of its matches played at the stadium that featured CSS Richard Toll.

External links
Stadium information

Municipal de Richard Toll